Leptobrama muelleri, also known as the Spot-fin beachsalmon is a species of perciform fish, primarily coastal marine or brackish water, fish found in tropical coastal waters of the Western Pacific off southern  New Guinea, Queensland and Western Australia. The beachsalmon is a popular sport fish in Australia, where it is sometimes called "flat salmon", "silver salmon", "slender bream" or "skippy" (a name also applied to several species of trevallies).

Historically, Leptobrama was placed in the sweeper family Pempheridae; while the two are similar, they in fact have no more characteristics in common than "any other two arbitrarily chosen acanthopterygian forms might be expected to have," therefore justifying the placement of Leptobrama in its own family. The genus name Leptobrama may be translated from the Greek leptos, meaning "thin" and the Old French bresme, meaning "breme" or "freshwater fish", an allusion to its tendency to enter the mouths of rivers and estuaries.

Description
This species is characterized by a deep, laterally compressed, and fusiform body. The dorsal fin is also reduced and begins behind the middle of the body; it contains four spines and 16-18 soft rays. The anal fin originates at about the middle of the body and contains three spines and 26-30 soft rays. The maxillae extend well beyond the small eyes; the preorbital is serrated, and the adipose lid is present.

The lateral line is described as having long, narrow tubes and from 75 to 77 scales. It has about 10 short gill rakers.

References

Percoidea
Fish described in 1878